, provisional designation , is a bright asteroid and synchronous binary system on a highly eccentric orbit, classified as near-Earth object and potentially hazardous asteroid of the Apollo group, approximately  in diameter. It was discovered on 18 December 2003, by astronomers with the Catalina Sky Survey at the Catalina Station near Tucson, Arizona, in the United States. The V-type asteroid has a short rotation period of 2.3 hours. Its 210-meter sized minor-planet moon was discovered at Arecibo Observatory in May 2004.

Orbit and classification 

 is a member of the Earth-crossing group of Apollo asteroids, the largest group of near-Earth objects with approximately 10 thousand known members.

It orbits the Sun at a distance of 0.8–1.4 AU once every 1 years and 2 months (427 days; semi-major axis of 1.11 AU). Its orbit has an eccentricity of 0.29 and an inclination of 44° with respect to the ecliptic. The body's observation arc begins with a precovery taken at the Siding Spring Observatory in November 1989, more than 14 years prior to its official discovery observation at Catalina.

Close approaches and Torino rating 

On the Torino Scale, this object was rated level 1 on 27 December 2003 with an observation arc of 8.7 days. It was removed from the risk table on 29 December 2003. Over the next ten million years the asteroid has a 6% chance of impacting Earth.

The asteroid's closest encounter with Earth will be on 29 April 2073, when it is projected to pass at  only (see table). 

 has unique orbital characteristics among minor planets. It is the only known binary asteroid to have an Earth MOID within the Moon's Apogee.

Meteor stream 
The fragment would have broken off the parent body within the last ten thousand years.

Physical characteristics 

This object has been characterized as a bright Vestian-like V-type asteroid.

Rotation period 

Several rotational lightcurve of this asteroid have been obtained from photometric observations. Analysis of the best-rated lightcurve gave a short rotation period of 2.343 hours with a brightness amplitude between 0.16 and 0.27 magnitude.

Diameter and albedo 

According to radar observations with the Arecibo Observatory and the survey carried out by the NEOWISE mission of NASA's Wide-field Infrared Survey Explorer, this asteroid measures between 1.0 and 1.717 kilometers in diameter and its surface has an albedo between 0.198 and 0.4861.

The Collaborative Asteroid Lightcurve Link derives an albedo of 0.5848 and adopts a diameter of 1.0 kilometer based on an absolute magnitude of 16.2.

Satellite 
The Arecibo radar observations in May 2004 revealed that  is a synchronous binary asteroid. Follow-up observations confirmed a 210-meter sized minor-planet moon orbiting its primary every 30 hours at a distance of 2.7 km.

Numbering and naming 

This minor planet was numbered by the Minor Planet Center on 26 September 2007. As of 2018, it has not been named.

References

External links 
 2003 YT1, IAUC 8336, 6 May 2004
 List of the Potentially Hazardous Asteroids (PHAs), Minor Planet Center
 Asteroids with Satellites, Robert Johnston, johnstonsarchive.net
 PHA Close Approaches To The Earth, Minor Planet Center
 Asteroid Lightcurve Database (LCDB), query form (info )
 Asteroids and comets rotation curves, CdR – Observatoire de Genève, Raoul Behrend
 
 
 

164121
164121
164121
164121
20031218
Near-Earth objects in 2016
20231103